Félix Mwamba Musasa (born November 25, 1976 in Lubumbashi) is a Congolese football player who played for, and captained, the Mpumalanga Black Aces in South African Premier Soccer League. He is the brother of Kabamba Musasa.

Career
He previously played for Orlando Pirates, TP Mazembe and Roan United (Zambia).

Musasa missed a large part of the Black Aces' first season back in the Premier Soccer League after serving an eight-game suspension on charges of misconduct relating to unsportsmanlike behavior and assault, following a challenge which broke the leg of opponent Oupa Ngulube during the promotion playoff match against Carara Kicks on May 24, 2009, he was given a red card.

He is known for wearing white gloves during games.

International career
Musasa was part of the Congolese 2004 African Nations Cup team. They finished bottom of their group in the first round of competition, failing to secure qualification for the quarter-finals.

References

External links

1982 births
Living people
People from Lubumbashi
Democratic Republic of the Congo footballers
Democratic Republic of the Congo expatriate sportspeople in South Africa
Democratic Republic of the Congo international footballers
2002 African Cup of Nations players
2004 African Cup of Nations players
Association football defenders
TP Mazembe players
Orlando Pirates F.C. players
Mpumalanga Black Aces F.C. players
Democratic Republic of the Congo expatriate footballers
Expatriate soccer players in South Africa
Expatriate footballers in Zambia
21st-century Democratic Republic of the Congo people